David Díaz Mangano (born 2 December 1992), commonly known as Bicho, is a Spanish footballer who plays as a midfielder.

Club career
Born in Puerto Real, Province of Cádiz, Bicho made his debuts as a senior with Puerto Real CF in 2011–12 season, representing the side in Primera Andaluza. In 2012 summer he joined Xerez CD, being initially assigned to the reserves.

Bicho made his official debut for the Andalusians' first team on 4 November 2012, playing the last 28 minutes in a 5–1 away win over Hércules CF in the Segunda División championship. He appeared in one further match during the campaign, with his side suffering relegation.

On 15 August 2013 Bicho signed with CF Pobla de Mafumet, in Tercera División. On 19 July 2015, after appearing as his side achieved its first promotion ever to Segunda División B, he was released.

References

External links

1992 births
Living people
Spanish footballers
Association football midfielders
Segunda División players
Tercera División players
Xerez CD B players
Xerez CD footballers
CF Pobla de Mafumet footballers